Alexander George Walkden, 1st Baron Walkden (11 May 1873 – 25 April 1951) was a British trade union leader and Labour politician.

Trade unionism
In 1906 Walkden was appointed the fourth General Secretary of the Railway Clerks' Association (the modern Transport Salaried Staffs' Association) at a particularly important point in its history. His immediate predecessor, John Stopford Challener, had absconded with most of the union's money—a crime which was only discovered after he committed suicide in Paris. Walkden was an extremely able administrator and socialist, who in his thirty years as general secretary built up the impoverished union into a respected organisation which was influential in both the Labour Party and the trade union movement. In his period of office he was also influential in the creation of the International Transport Workers' Federation (ITF). At thirty years (1906–1936) he is the longest-serving general secretary in the history of the RCA/TSSA, his nearest rival being the fifteen years served by Richard Rosser between 1989 and 2004. When the union built its new headquarters building adjacent to London's Euston railway station in the 1960s, it was named Walkden House in his honour.

Political career
Walkden unsuccessfully stood for Parliament as the Labour candidate in Wolverhampton West at the 1918 general election, at a by-election in 1922 and at the 1922 general election. He was unsuccessful again in Heywood and Radcliffe in 1924, but was elected at the 1929 general election as Member of Parliament (MP) for Bristol South. Although seriously ill for much of the 1929–1931 Parliament, Walkden was active in pressing for legislation to create London Transport, a long-time policy of the union. The Labour government fell before the London Passenger Transport Act could be passed, and he lost his seat in the 1931 general election but as a union leader, he pressed the subsequent National Government to reintroduce the bill, which it did in 1932, and it came into effect in 1933. Walkden was re-elected for Bristol South at the 1935 general election, serving until he retired from the House of Commons at the 1945 general election. on 9 July 1945 he was elevated to the peerage as Baron Walkden, of Great Bookham in the County of Surrey. He then served under Clement Attlee as Captain of the Yeomen of the Guard (Deputy Chief Whip in the House of Lords) from 1945 until 1949.

Personal life
Lord Walkden died in April 1951, aged 77, when the barony became extinct.

References

External links 
 
Single or Return: The History of the TSSA – Chapter 3 (1906)
Single or Return: The History of the TSSA – Chapter 6 (Parliamentary candidate 1912)
Single or Return: The History of the TSSA – Chapter 17 (The London Passenger Transport Act (1933))

1873 births
1951 deaths
General Secretaries of the Transport Salaried Staffs' Association
Labour Party (UK) MPs for English constituencies
Labour Party (UK) hereditary peers
Members of the General Council of the Trades Union Congress
Ministers in the Attlee governments, 1945–1951
Politics of Bristol
Presidents of the Trades Union Congress
Transport Salaried Staffs' Association-sponsored MPs
UK MPs 1929–1931
UK MPs 1935–1945
UK MPs who were granted peerages
Barons created by George VI